Apollonia was a town of ancient Mysia, Anatolia, situated on an eminence east of Pergamum, on the way to Sardis. It seems to have been near the borders of Mysia and Lydia. 

The site of Apollonia is located between the modern Turkish towns of Hamidiye and Dualar. The larger town of Soma is just to the East.

See also
 List of ancient Greek cities

References

Ancient Greek archaeological sites in Turkey
Greek colonies in Mysia
Populated places in ancient Mysia
Former populated places in Turkey
Geography of İzmir Province
History of İzmir Province